Asthenosoma is a genus of sea urchins in the family Echinothuriidae. Their spines are covered with harmful venom capsules.

Taxonomy
The World Echinoidea Database recognises the following species:
 Asthenosoma dilatatum Mortensen, 1934
 Asthenosoma ijimai Yoshiwara, 1897
 Asthenosoma intermedium H.L. Clark, 1938
 Asthenosoma marisrubri Weinberg & de Ridder, 1998 – "Red sea fire urchin"
 Asthenosoma periculosum Endean, 1964
 Asthenosoma striatissimum Ravn, 1928 †
 Asthenosoma varium Grube, 1868 – "fire sea urchin".

"†" means an extinct taxon.

References

 
Extant Middle Jurassic first appearances